Omamo is a surname. Notable people with the surname include:

William Odongo Omamo (1928–2010), Kenyan politician
Raychelle Omamo (born 1962), Kenyan lawyer and politician, daughter of William

Surnames of Kenyan origin